Enrico Da Ros (born February 24, 1988 in Brugnera) is an Italian professional football player who currently plays in the Eccellenza Friuli – Venezia Giulia for U. Triestina 2012.

External links
 

1988 births
Living people
Italian footballers
Association football forwards
U.S. Triestina Calcio 1918 players
A.S.D. Sacilese Calcio players